The College Clean Restoration Curling Classic is an annual bonspiel on the World Curling Tour.  It is held annually in December at the Nutana Curling Club in Saskatoon, Saskatchewan.

The event has been held annually since 1976. Bernie Sparkes won the first ever event.

Event names
1976–1977: Labatt Curling Classic
1978–1984: Bessborough Curling Classic
1985–1986: Bessborough-Pacific Western Classic
1987–1989: Canadian Airlines-Bessborough Curling Classic
1990: Canadian Airlines Delta Bessborough Classic
1991: Canadian Airlines/Bessborough Curling Classic
1992: Delta Bessborough Cantel Curling Classic
1993–1996: Delta Bessborough SaskTel Classic
1997: Parktown Mens Curling Classic
1998: Molson Saskatoon Classic
1999–2004: Pointoptical Curling Classic
2005–2007: Point Optical Charity Classic
2008–2015: PointOptical Curling Classic
2016–present: College Clean Restoration Curling Classic

Past champions
Only skips listed

Notes

References

Point Optical Curling Classic